Michael McPhail (born December 15, 1981) is an American rifle shooter. He won a gold medal in the 50 metre rifle prone event at the 2011 Pan American Games. He competed in the 50 metre rifle prone event at the 2012 Summer Olympics, where he placed 9th.

McPhail started training in shooting in 1996. On August 16, 2004, he enlisted in the U.S. Army. After completing basic and infantry training at Fort Benning, in early 2005 he was assigned to the U.S. Army Marksmanship Unit.

References

External links

1981 births
Living people
American male sport shooters
United States Army soldiers
United States Distinguished Marksman
Olympic shooters of the United States
Shooters at the 2011 Pan American Games
Shooters at the 2012 Summer Olympics
Shooters at the 2016 Summer Olympics
People from Darlington, Wisconsin
Pan American Games gold medalists for the United States
Pan American Games medalists in shooting
Shooters at the 2015 Pan American Games
ISSF rifle shooters
Shooters at the 2019 Pan American Games
Medalists at the 2011 Pan American Games
Medalists at the 2015 Pan American Games
Medalists at the 2019 Pan American Games
20th-century American people
21st-century American people